Casaccia may refer to:

 Casaccia, Graubünden, a village in the Val Bregaglia, in the Swiss canton of Graubünden
 Casaccia, Ticino, a settlement in the Barbengo quarter of the Swiss city of Lugano